Baghora is a town near Khurai City in Sagar district in central India.

Cities and towns in Sagar district
Sagar, Madhya Pradesh